Stephen James Frost (born March 30, 1972) is an American politician who served in the Texas House of Representatives from 2005-2011.

Life
Frost was born on March 30, 1972 to George and Monica Frost in Cass County, Texas. The Frost family moved to Maud, Texas in 1980. He graduated from Texas A&M - Texarkana with a B.S. in History. In 1997, Stephen went on to earn a J.D. degree from the University of Arkansas at Little Rock School of Law. In 2002, he married Kimberly Davis.

Frost was elected as the representative for the 1st district of the Texas House of Representatives in the 2004 election and started the term on January 11, 2005. He also won the 2006 and 2008 elections for this seat. He ran again in 2010, but lost to George Lavender in the general election.

Election Results

2004 Election

2006 Election

2008 Election

2010 Election

References

1972 births
Living people
21st-century American politicians
Democratic Party members of the Texas House of Representatives
People from Cass County, Texas
Texas A&M University–Texarkana alumni